Mohammad Shamsuzzoha (died 1969) was a writer , professor and proctor at Rajshahi University. Shamsuzzoha was the first university teacher in erstwhile East Pakistan (now Bangladesh) who was killed by the Pakistani Military forces at the eve of 1969 revolution movement of East Pakistan, which ultimately became the Bangladesh Liberation War. In 2008, he was awarded the Independence Day Award.

Early life
He was born in Onda, Bankura in West Bengal, India. After the India partition, he migrated to erstwhile East Pakistan in 1950. He passed his matriculation exam in 1948 from Bankura Zilla School and passed ISc in 1950 from Bankura Christian College.   He achieved BSc (honours) degree in Chemistry in 1953 and MSc in 1954 from Dhaka University.  Mohammad Shamsuzzoha also participated bravely in the Bengali Language Movement during his university life. In 1964 he obtained his PhD degree from Imperial College London.

Career
At first Mohammad Shamsuzzoha joined Rajshahi University as a Development Officer in 1961 and on that year he also became lecturer in the Department of Chemistry. He was promoted as Reader of the Chemistry Department. On 1 May 1968 he received the Proctor post of the university. He was the first university teacher who was martyred from 1947 to 1969.

Death

Following the murder of Sergeant Zahurul haq in custody, one of the accused convict of Agartala Conspiracy Case on 15 February, the students of Rajshahi University started staging demonstration. On 17 February the students were injured by the Pakistani police. On the same day local administration imposed section 144 on  Natore-Rajshahi Highway near to Rajshahi University.  When the students violated the section, the Pakistani army was deployed to shoot the students, but Shamsuzzoha talked with them and urged them not to fire. When the tension grew, the army fired on Shamsuzzoha. He was taken to the hospital and died there.  A memorial sculpture was built right beside the Shahid Shamsuzzoha Hall, called "Sfulinga" for Dr. Shamsuzzoha as a symbol of respect.

Legacy
Mohammad Shamsuzzoha was buried on front of the administration building of Rajshahi University. His death added a new dimension in the anti-Ayub mass movement, as well as the fall of Ayub government was quickened. 18 February  is observed as Shahid Zoha Dibos (Martyr Zoha Day) in Bangladesh. A student hall of the University of Rajshahi was named as Shaheed Shamsuzzoha Hall in commemoration of his highest sacrifice for the cause of the nation.

Gallery

References

1934 births
1969 deaths
Academic staff of the University of Rajshahi
University of Dhaka alumni
Alumni of Imperial College London
People from Bankura district
Causes and prelude of the Bangladesh Liberation War
Protest-related deaths
Recipients of the Independence Day Award